The following is an incomplete list of places which have been nicknamed Venice of the East.

List

See also
 Venezuela, country whose name means "Little Venice"
 Venice of the North
 Little Venice
 Paris of the East
 Paris of the West
 Little Paris

References

    20^ Tourist Places in Kerala, India

Lists of cities in Asia
Venice of the East